The first season of the HBO television series Boardwalk Empire premiered on September 19, 2010 and concluded on December 5, 2010, consisting of 12 episodes. The series was created by Terence Winter and based on the book Boardwalk Empire: The Birth, High Times and Corruption of Atlantic City by Nelson Johnson. Set in Atlantic City, New Jersey, during the Prohibition era, the series stars Steve Buscemi as Enoch "Nucky" Thompson (based on the historical Enoch L. Johnson), a political figure who rose to prominence and controlled Atlantic City, New Jersey, during the Prohibition period of the 1920s and 1930s. The first season takes place between January and November 1920, beginning with the start of national prohibition and ending with the 1920 presidential election.

The first episode, with a final cost of $18 million, was directed by Martin Scorsese and was the most expensive pilot episode produced in television history.

The first season was met with widespread praise, particularly for its visual style and historical accuracy. On the review aggregator website Metacritic, the first season scored 88/100 based on 30 reviews, indicating "universal acclaim". The American Film Institute named Boardwalk Empire one of the ten "best television programs of the year".

Cast

Main

 Steve Buscemi as Enoch "Nucky" Thompson
 Michael Pitt as James "Jimmy" Darmody
 Kelly Macdonald as Margaret Schroeder
 Michael Shannon as Nelson Van Alden
 Shea Whigham as Elias "Eli" Thompson
 Aleksa Palladino as Angela Darmody
 Michael Stuhlbarg as Arnold Rothstein
 Stephen Graham as Al Capone
 Vincent Piazza as Charlie Luciano
 Paz de la Huerta as Lucy Danziger
 Michael Kenneth Williams as Albert "Chalky" White
 Anthony Laciura as Eddie Kessler
 Paul Sparks as Michael "Mickey Doyle" Kozik
 Dabney Coleman as Commodore Louis Kaestner

Recurring

Production

Development 
Terence Winter, who had served as executive producer and writer on the HBO series The Sopranos, was hired to adapt the novel Boardwalk Empire on June 4, 2008. Winter had been interested in creating a series set in the 1920s, feeling that it had never properly been explored before. It was for this reason that he decided to focus his adaption of the novel on the Prohibition era section. On September 1, 2009, it was announced that Academy Award-winning director Martin Scorsese would direct the pilot. It would be the first time he had directed an episode of television since an episode of Steven Spielberg's Amazing Stories in 1986. The production would be very ambitious, with some even speculating it would be too large scale for television. "I kept thinking 'This is pointless. How can we possibly afford a boardwalk, or an empire? says creator Terence Winter. "We can't call it 'Boardwalk Empire' and not see a boardwalk." The production would eventually build a  boardwalk in an empty lot in Brooklyn, New York at the cost of five million dollars. Despite a reported budget of up to $50 million, the pilot's final budget came in at $18 million.

On why he chose to return to television, Scorsese said "What's happening the past 9 to 10 years, particularly at HBO, is what we had hoped for in the mid-Sixties with films being made for television at first. We'd hoped there would be this kind of freedom and also the ability to create another world and create longform characters and story. That didn't happen in the 1970s, 1980s and in the 1990s I think. And of course ...HBO is a trailblazer in this. I've been tempted over the years to be involved with them because of the nature of long-form and their development of character and plot." He went on to praise network HBO by saying, "A number of the episodes, in so many of their series, they're thoughtful, intelligent [and] brilliantly put together... It's a new opportunity for storytelling. It's very different from television of the past."

Casting 
"Scorsese is an actor magnet," commented Winter. "Everybody wants to work with him. I had all these pictures on my wall and I thought, 'I'd really better write some good stuff for these people. In casting the role of Nucky Thompson (based upon real-life Atlantic City political boss Enoch L. Johnson), Winter wanted to stray from the real life Johnson as much as possible. "If we were going to cast accurately what the real Nucky looked like, we'd have cast Jim Gandolfini." The idea of casting Steve Buscemi in the lead role came about when Scorsese mentioned wanting to work with the actor, whom Winter knew well having worked with him on The Sopranos. Winter sent the script out to Buscemi, who responded very enthusiastically. "I just thought, 'Wow. I'm almost sorry I've read this, because if I don't get it, I'm going to be so sad.' My response was 'Terry, I know you're looking at other actors'... and he said, 'No, no, Steve, I said we want you. Explained Scorsese, "I love the range he has, his dramatic sense, but also his sense of humor."

The casting of Buscemi was soon followed by Michael Pitt, best known for his roles in the Sandra Bullock film Murder by Numbers and in the television series Dawson's Creek. He was soon joined by Kelly Macdonald, Vincent Piazza and Michael Shannon, who had just received an Oscar nomination for his role in the Sam Mendes film Revolutionary Road.

Filming 
Filming for the pilot took place at various locations in and around New York City in June 2009. In creating the visual effects for the series, the company turned to Brooklyn-based effects company Brainstorm Digital. Says Glenn Allen, visual effects producer for Boardwalk Empire and co-founder of Brainstorm, "It's our most complex job to date. Everything is HD now, so we have to treat it like a feature film." "Anytime you get to work on a period piece, it's more fun," comments visual effects artist Chris "Pinkus" Wesselman, who used archival photographs, postcards, and architectural plans to recreate the Atlantic City boardwalks as accurately as possible. "We got to explore what the old Atlantic City was really like. The piers were one of the toughest parts because every summer they would change—new houses, new advertisements." It took two months for the firm to complete all the visual effects for the pilot.

Costume design
Designed by John Dunn and tailored by Martin Greenfield, Boardwalk Empire's costumes were based on 1920s tailoring books from the Fashion Institute of Technology's research libraries and examples found at the Brooklyn Museum and the Met. The costumes have also been rented from the Daybreak Vintage Company located in Albany, NY which also exhibits at the Manhattan Vintage Clothing Show. Dunn's designs were meticulously detailed, including a collar pin for Nucky's shirts and even going so far as to incorporate specially ordered woolens for suiting. Dunn told Esquire magazine in a September 2010 interview, "With Marty and Terry Winters, I developed the feel for each of the characters. We all wanted it to be very, very accurate and specific to the period.... I don't like to do boring clothing, but you also have to make sure that you're not suddenly putting somebody in something that isn't going to make sense four episodes from now."
These tailors were supplied by textile importer HMS fabrics and Gladstone ltd.

Martin Scorsese's contribution
Martin Scorsese was involved in the filming even before creator Terence Winter. He directed the pilot and established the look of the show, which other directors later emulated to make the show feel seamless. He is also one of the executive producers of the show. Winter stated that Scorsese weighs in on the casting decisions, watches all the cuts and dailies. Up until the shooting of the show's first season, Scorsese and Winter would meet every Sunday afternoon to review what went on during the week where Scorsese would have comments and suggestions. Scorsese continued to be creatively involved in the ongoing production, but did not direct any more episodes.

Episodes

Reception

Critical reception
The first season of Boardwalk Empire received overwhelmingly positive reviews from critics. On the review aggregator website Metacritic, the first season scored 88 out of 100 based on 30 reviews. The American Film Institute named Boardwalk Empire one of the ten "best television programs of the year". Another aggregator website, Rotten Tomatoes, reported 96% of critics gave the first season a "Certified Fresh" rating, based on 26 reviews with an average score of 8.6/10, with the site consensus stating "Thought-provoking, violent, and filled with lush period detail, Boardwalk Empire is a gangster drama of uncommon depth and scope."

David Hinkley of the New York Daily News awarded the series five stars, saying "Watching HBO's new 'Boardwalk Empire' is like sitting in your favorite tavern and hearing someone say, 'Drinks are on the house.' Friends, it does not get much better." Paige Wiser of the Chicago Sun-Times called it "... an event not to be missed," and praised Buscemi in particular, calling his performance "fascinating." TV Guide'''s Matt Roush praised the marriage of Scorsese and Winter, saying it "... brilliantly marries Martin Scorsese's virtuosic cinematic eye to Terence Winter's panoramic mastery of rich character and eventful story," and finished his review by stating "It's the most purely—and impurely—enjoyable storytelling HBO has delivered in ages, like a movie that you never want to end." Variety's Brian Lowry praised the show for returning network HBO to top form, saying "This is, quite simply, television at its finest, occupying a sweet spot that—for all the able competition—still remains unique to HBO: An expensive, explicit, character-driven program, tackling material no broadcast network or movie studio would dare touch ... For those wondering when the channel would deliver another franchise to definitively put it on top of the world, Ma, the wait is over: Go directly to 'Boardwalk.'" "One of the unexpected joys of 'Boardwalk Empire,' though, lies in the way the show revels in the oddities of its time, peeling back the layers of polite society to reveal a giddy shadow world of criminals and politicians collaborating to keep the liquor flowing," says online magazine Salon's Heather Havrilesky who went on to call the pilot "breathtaking." Roberto Bianco from USA Today said in his review that Boardwalk Empire was "Extravagantly produced, shockingly violent and as cold and hard as ice, Boardwalk Empire brings us back to the world's former playground at the start of Prohibition—and brings HBO back to the forefront of the TV-series race."

Awards and nominations

On July 14, 2011 Boardwalk Empire was nominated for 18 Emmy Awards that included Outstanding Drama Series, Outstanding Lead Actor in a Drama Series (Steve Buscemi) and Outstanding Supporting Actress in a Drama Series (Kelly Macdonald).Boardwalk Empire won a Writers Guild of America Award for Best Writing in a New Series and was nominated for Best Writing in a Drama Series. In addition, the show won a Golden Globe for best Dramatic Series, Buscemi won Best Actor in Dramatic Series and MacDonald was nominated for Best Supporting Actress in a Series, Miniseries or Motion Picture Made for Television. The cast won the Screen Actor's Guild Award for Best Ensemble in a Drama Series, while Steve Buscemi won the Screen Actor's Guild Award for Outstanding Performance by a Male Actor in a Drama Series and Martin Scorsese won the Directors Guild Award for Outstanding Directorial Achievement in Dramatic Series. Boardwalk Empire was in The American Film Institute's Top Ten List for TV in 2010.Boardwalk Empire also won two awards at the 9th Annual Visual Effects Society Awards. The first for "Outstanding Supporting Visual Effects in a Broadcast Program" and second for "Outstanding Models & Miniatures in a Broadcast Program or Commercial". The former was received by Richard Friedlander (of Brainstorm Digital), Robert Stromberg, Paul Graff and David Taritero; the latter was received by Brendan Fitzgerald, John Corbett and Matthew Conner of Brainstorm Digital.

Ratings
On its original airing, the pilot episode gained a 2.0/5 ratings share among adults aged 18–49 and garnered 4.81 million viewers. The episode was re-played twice that night, once at 10:15 p.m. and again at 11:30 p.m. Taking these broadcasts into account, a total of 7.1 million Americans viewed the episode on the night of its original broadcast, and is the highest rated premiere for an HBO series since the pilot of Deadwood in March 2004. The season finale was watched by 3.29 million viewers, attaining a 1.3 adults 18–49 rating.

Home media releases
The first season was released on Blu-ray and DVD in region 1 on January 10, 2012, in region 2 on January 9, 2012, and in region 4 on January 11, 2012.

Special features include:
 Enhanced Viewing (BD only) – Learn more about the production process and historical background from A.C. historians
 Making Boardwalk Empire'' – Behind-the-scenes look at the set, featuring interviews from the cast and crew
 Character Dossier – Comprehensive character guide
 Creating the Boardwalk – Learn how the actual Boardwalk set was created
 Atlantic City: The Original Sin City – 30-minute documentary on the culture and social climate of A.C. at the time
 Speakeasy Tour – A look at famed Prohibition speakeasies in Chicago and New York
 Audio Commentaries – Six audio commentaries from various cast and crew

References

External links 
 
 

Boardwalk Empire
2010 American television seasons
Fiction set in 1920